Mario Gurma (born 14 April 1982) is an Albanian former professional footballer.

Club career
Gurma previously played for Levadiakos F.C. in the Greek Super League and for Panetolikos in the Beta Ethniki.  He also played in Italy for Reggiana and for U.S. Gavorrano and Tricase calcio. In summer 2013 he moved to Olympiakos Volou 1937 F.C. In January 2021, Gurma got out of retirement to help his hometown club Butrinti Sarandë get promoted to Albanian First League after 5 years, scoring the winning goal in the promotion/relegation play-off against Oriku.

References

External links

1982 births
Living people
People from Sarandë
Association football forwards
Albanian footballers
Levadiakos F.C. players
Proodeftiki F.C. players
Diagoras F.C. players
Panachaiki F.C. players
Panetolikos F.C. players
A.C. Reggiana 1919 players
U.S. Gavorrano players
Olympiacos Volos F.C. players
PAS Lamia 1964 players
Paganese Calcio 1926 players
S.S. Racing Club Roma players
Albanian expatriate footballers
Expatriate footballers in Greece
Expatriate footballers in Italy
Albanian expatriate sportspeople in Greece
Albanian expatriate sportspeople in Italy
S.S.D. Città di Campobasso players